Richard McLeod (born 13 October 1965) is a New Zealand cricketer. He played in three first-class matches for Central Districts in 1990/91.

See also
 List of Central Districts representative cricketers

References

External links
 

1965 births
Living people
New Zealand cricketers
Central Districts cricketers
Cricketers from Nelson, New Zealand